Branimir "Johnny" Štulić (born 11 April 1953) is a Yugoslav singer-songwriter, musician and author, best known for being the frontman of the popular Yugoslav rock group Azra. He is known for his charismatic stage performances and inspiring song lyrics that often combined rock poetry with a strong sense for social commentary, which is the cause for his becoming a cult figure.

Early life
Štulić was born on 11 April 1953, in Skopje, where his mother Slavica (née Milovac) and father Ivan Štulić–an officer in the Yugoslav People's Army–were stationed at the time. His paternal Croatian family originates from Nin, being one of the oldest families from the town. At the age of seven, Štulić moved with his family to Jastrebarsko. In January 1967, Štulić moved to Zagreb where he attended high school and later, for two years, studied phonetics and history at the University of Zagreb's Faculty of Philosophy before dropping out.

Music career

He began his musical career with a band named "Balkan Sevdah band", performing beside own songs also The Beatles covers and folk music. The name was changed to Azra in 1977. The initial line up which included Jura Stublić, Marino Pelajić and Mladen Juričić soon dissolved, and they formed another popular band Film. During the 1980s, Azra became one of the most prominent and influential musical acts in Yugoslavia. The Azra days brought Štulić widespread fame in Yugoslavia, as well as a rabid and devoted youth following – Štulić often used his music as commentary directed towards the social and political conditions in the then-Socialist Yugoslavia. 

He has been living in the Netherlands since 1986. From 1989 performed under his name with live support of "Sevdah Shuttle Band", and released solo studio albums Balkanska rapsodija (1989) and Balegari ne vjeruju sreći (1990). When it became obvious to him that Yugoslavia will collapse, Štulić in 1991 in Sarajevo recorded the album Sevdah za Paulu Horvat (released in 1995), documentary Das ist Johnny in which the most memorable moment was when viewed from the window of Sarajevo hotel room and concluded that soon all would burn, and his alleged last visit of the territory was in 1995 in Belgrade, where he produced album Anali and promoted book Božanska Ilijada. In regards to the Yugoslav war, Štulić frequently expressed his disapproval of separatism and was a fervent believer of Yugoslavism and Brotherhood and unity. He commented that "I have no passport, no money and have no place to go back. I had a Yugoslav one and it expired. Yugoslavia is no more, it's the same as when you are born and you are told: this is your dad, this is your mother, because, according to Homer, no one knows, when they are born, who gave birth to them, at least the first three years. And now I do not have my parents and that's why I'm happy". After most Yugoslav Wars ended in 1995, Štulić recorded two solo albums, both published in Belgrade, Serbia, with the last Blase in 1997.

Life in the Netherlands
In 2005 he published an autobiography called "Smijurija u mjerama", with mixed to positive reception. Hrvoje Horvat, a Croatian journalist, wrote a biography of Johnny Štulić titled "Fantom slobode", ("The Phantom of Freedom"), published in 2006. Due to Štulić's immense popularity in the former Yugoslavia, the book was an immediate commercial success. However, it was also heavily criticized by many literary critics, and even Štulić himself, for its sometime poor writing quality and alleged misinterpretation of facts. Ines Pletikos directed a documentary film Kad Miki kaže da se boji (2004), while Kruno Petrinović a book, Prilozi za biografiju Johnnyja B. Štulića (2006), about the heroes of his poems.

Today, Štulić lives a modest and ascetic lifestyle in Houten, Netherlands, with wife Josephine Grundmeiyer. He typically does not give interviews and is very protective of his privacy. He states he has no interest in going back to his rock career, but in the past few years he has recorded and posted on YouTube over 600 traditional songs, hit covers and some original material. He works on the Serbo-Croatian translation of many ancient and medieval works.

In 2012 he initiated a lawsuit against Croatia Records from Zagreb, the direct successor of Jugoton, over royalty rights, as well book publisher from Belgrade, for copyright infringement. In revolt to the statements made by music editor from the Croatia Records and former Jugoton, Štulić stated that Azra is not a Croatian band. About appearing in Croatia he said that he does not want to perform in “occupied territories” referring to nations that broke away from Yugoslavia. He saw himself as Yugoslavian and said that Yugoslavia is his only country of origin. He also stated that he does not want to go to Serbia either. Štulić states he sees no reason to return to the Balkans, as he “went as far away as possible from people who suddenly wanted to kill each other”. Due to an issue of him not having a valid passport he declined both Croatian and Serbian passports and citizenship.

Discography
 Balkanska rapsodija (1989, Jugoton) 
 Balegari ne vjeruju sreći (1990, Jugoton) 
 Sevdah za Paulu Horvat (1991, Komuna) 
 Anali (1995, Komuna) 
 Blase (1997, Hi-Fi Centar)

References

External links
 
 

1953 births
Living people
Croatian expatriates in the Netherlands
Croatian rock singers
Croatian rock guitarists
Yugoslav expatriates in the Netherlands
20th-century Croatian male singers
Yugoslav male singers
People from Houten
Musicians from Skopje
Musicians from Zagreb